The Last of Us Part I is a 2022 action-adventure game developed by Naughty Dog and published by Sony Interactive Entertainment. A remake of the 2013 game The Last of Us, it features revised gameplay, including enhanced combat and exploration, and expanded accessibility options. The single-player story follows Joel, who is tasked with escorting the young Ellie across a post-apocalyptic United States and defend against cannibalistic creatures infected by a mutated strain of the Cordyceps fungus. The game includes the expansion The Last of Us: Left Behind, a single-player campaign following Ellie and her best friend Riley. The original game's online multiplayer mode is omitted.

Development was led by game director Matthew Gallant and creative director Shaun Escayg, who replaced original directors Bruce Straley and Neil Druckmann. Part I was rebuilt to take advantage of updated hardware, requiring new animations, art direction, and character models to align with the vision of the original development team. The visual departments analyzed the original cutscenes and narrative beats to identify crucial storylines and their original direction and purpose. The team expanded upon the gameplay, technology, and accessibility features of The Last of Us Part II (2020), using its game engine and building upon it with the updated technology. The cutscenes feature audio descriptions, for which the developers collaborated with Descriptive Video Works. Part I supports 3D audio, as well as the haptic feedback and adaptive triggers of the DualSense controller.

Following several leaks, The Last of Us Part I was announced in June 2022 and released for PlayStation 5 on September 2; it is scheduled for release on Windows on March 28, 2023. It received positive reviews, with praise for its graphical enhancements, facial animations, artificial intelligence, and its added accessibility, audio, and controller options. The response to its gameplay and level design was mixed, and several critics questioned the necessity of a remake, especially considering its price. It received an award at the Visual Effects Society Awards, and nominations at the Game Awards and Golden Joystick Awards.

Gameplay 

The Last of Us Part I is a remake of the 2013 video game The Last of Us, an action-adventure game played from a third-person perspective. The player traverses post-apocalyptic environments to advance the story, and uses firearms, improvised weapons, hand-to-hand combat, and stealth to defend against hostile humans and cannibalistic creatures known as the Infected, who have been infected by a mutated strain of the Cordyceps fungus. For most of the game, player character Joel escorts a young girl, Ellie, across the United States. The player controls Ellie throughout the winter segment, and briefly controls Joel's daughter Sarah in the opening sequence. In the included expansion The Last of Us: Left Behind, the player controls Ellie as she spends time with her best friend and love interest Riley Abel. The original game's online multiplayer mode is omitted from PartI, and its narrative is entirely unchanged.

The remake features revised gameplay, including enhanced combat and exploration. The overhauled artificial intelligence (AI) allows more non-player characters (NPCs) on screen, with enemy AI acting more aggressive and tactical than in the original game. The Infected received some gameplay adaptations, such as new Stalker animations and a charge move for Bloaters. New gameplay additions include a permadeath mode, a speedrun-focused mode, and new costumes for Joel and Ellie. The expanded accessibility options include customizable controls, audio description for cutscenes, and haptic feedback during dialogue; difficulty modes can be customized to change enemy resilience, stealth efficacy, and resource availability. The overhauled photo mode adds several bonus features, allowing visual and gameplay modifiers such as slow motion and infinite ammunition.

On PlayStation 5, the game supports hardware features such as 3D audio, and uses the haptic feedback and adaptive triggers of the DualSense controller to emulate gameplay actions such as shooting a shotgun or drawing a bowstring. It can display at native 4K resolution at 30 frames per second, or upscaled resolution at a targeted 60 frames per second; with variable refresh rate enabled, both modes allow an unlocked frame rate, capable of more than 60 frames per second.

Development 

The Last of Us Part I was developed by Naughty Dog and published by Sony Interactive Entertainment. Development was led by game director Matthew Gallant and creative director Shaun Escayg, who replaced original directors Bruce Straley and Neil Druckmann, respectively. Gallant previously worked as a combat designer on the original game and Uncharted 4: A Thief's End (2016), and became lead systems designer on The Last of Us Part II (2020), co-leading its accessibility features. Escayg was lead cinematic animator on The Last of Us—his first game—and creative director on Uncharted: The Lost Legacy (2017), followed by his work as creative director and co-writer of Marvel's Avengers (2020) at Crystal Dynamics, before returning to Naughty Dog in April 2021. Splitting their directing duties, Escayg took responsibility for the cinematics. Gallant found he resonated with the themes much more closely than during the development of the original game, having become a father in the interim. According to Escayg, the team approached the remake as "a love letter to our fans, to the franchise, and to ourselves as developers"; they felt a responsibility to preserve its essence and quality. Several of the creative leadership team of Part I worked on the original game.

Naughty Dog hoped the remake would allow Part I and Part II to be played sequentially with no technological or visual discrepancies. They felt new audiences, such as viewers of the television adaptation and new PlayStation 5 players, could be reached. The remake was partially inspired by Part II flashback scenes, for which the team rebuilt areas and assets from the original game: Gallant said that several team members pondered if "the whole game looked as good as those flashback sequences, how exciting that would be". Development began by transitioning the game to Part IIs updated game engine. The game was rebuilt to use the PlayStation 5 hardware, requiring new art direction, animation, and character models. The technological and graphical enhancements were intended to align with the vision of the original game's team. Escayg wanted each element to make the player feel grounded and immersed in the world. The team re-evaluated thousands of "micro decisions" during development, removing objects deemed unimportant or distracting and detailing or redesigning those that required improvements. Areas were re-evaluated to determine if their designs were a result of the PlayStation 3's technical limitations; where appropriate, some areas were rebuilt or further detailed.

The developers rationalized the rebuilt accessibility features as important to the remake. They expanded the features from Part II—assisted by Part I being built in Part IIs engine—with three presets configuring settings recommended for players requiring hearing, motor, or visual aids. During the development of The Last of Us Part II, blind accessibility consultant Brandon Cole noted that visually-impaired players missed environmental context and the unspoken interactions between characters, but the production timeline limited the team's ability to implement a solution. Gallant revisited the idea for PartI and collaborated with Descriptive Video Works to create audio descriptions for cutscenes. Writing and recording the audio descriptions caused difficulties, as they had to convey the information succinctly while maintaining the context and themes. The customizable vibration options were inspired by a review of Uncharted: Legacy of Thieves Collection (2022) from Can I Play That?, which criticized the lack of variability. The team identified sequences that would present accessibility problems—such as the arcade sequence in Left Behind—and engaged several consultants for assistance, including Cole.

The combat system—particularly melee—evolved using development tools from The Last of Us Part II. The team felt that the original game's combat sequences were iconic and required no significant overhaul; they forwent the ability to go prone in gameplay—a feature added in Part II—as it would have "broken the gameplay and the combat space" since the original game was not built for it. Part IIs dodge mechanic was similarly omitted as it required reworking both enemy attacks and the gameplay space, and would diminish the claustrophobia and tension of the fights; Gallant noted that "Joel fundamentally needs to  different than playing as Ellie", Part IIs playable protagonist. PlayStation 3 hardware limitations forced the original team to "hack together" combat sequences, including some that are pre-scripted; advancements on the PlayStation 5 allowed the developers to create dynamic encounters, with AI directing the enemy non-playable characters (NPCs) to investigate and analyze with more accuracy. The fundamental AI technology built upon Part IIs. While the original game was limited to eight NPCs during enemy encounters—forcing some to disregard the player in the presence of others—the PlayStation 5 allows up to 128 active NPCs focusing on the player. In some instances, the original game could not have both male and female Infected fighting simultaneously, which was corrected in the remake. Gallant found the new technology made gameplay sequences more unpredictable.

The visual departments analyzed the original game to understand it better, focusing development resources on the most crucial scenes and storylines to maximize their impact. Rather than simply improving the visuals, the team analyzed its cutscenes and narrative beats, employing modernized techniques to emphasize story moments. Art director Erick Pangilinan ensured that the team remembered the original direction and purpose behind each scene; in some instances during development, they lost track of the original purpose, which would impact other scenes later on. The original game's vision was to emphasize the world's beauty, as opposed to a visually dark and dystopian image; art director Sebastian Gromann felt that PlayStation 5 allowed a truer realization of this vision, particularly due to the more complex models and shaders allowing increased fidelity and volume of foliage. Characters and environments benefited from an increased polygon count. The original motion capture data was used for the cinematics, with the facial animation overhauled to more closely resemble the original performances. The remake was considered a good opportunity to expand some environments, such as adding detail and items to the back offices of the Boston museum, and visually shifting the university section for a more claustrophobic feeling. The team forced themselves to pull back on some additions as they failed to heighten the experience or fit within the narrative context; trees and overgrowth were initially added to the military city, but removed when the team realized it would be unrealistic in the setting.

The addition of a speedrunning mode was suggested by one of the team members interested in the field, and the developers consulted with professional speedrunners. Gallant felt the permadeath mode raised the stakes of the original game's already-tense combat. The developers used the PlayStation 5's Tempest Engine—an evolution of technology from the PlayStation 4—to render the 3D audio, including during quieter moments of dialogue. Audio programmers spent over a year reworking Naughty Dog's audio engine, as it was incompatible with the Tempest Engine's features. The audio mixing and mastering processes were overhauled for increased clarity and fidelity. The team reused much of the sound from the original game as they considered it iconic; some of the re-recorded audio included the workbench upgrades, as well as murmuration for the Infected, introduced in Part II. The actors' original performances were maintained.

Release 
The existence of a remake of The Last of Us was first reported in April 2021 by Bloomberg Newss Jason Schreier. The report claimed that the game, codenamed "T1X", had started at Sony's Visual Arts Support Group studio but was later moved under Naughty Dog's budget after some staff joined the project in 2020. A PlayStation Store listing with a trailer and information about the game was prematurely released on June 9, 2022. The game was announced for PlayStation 5 and Windows later that day at Summer Game Fest. Reactions to the remake's announcement were mixed, as some journalists and players considered another release following The Last of Us Remastered superfluous and questioned the  price point.

Naughty Dog announced special edition versions that grant in-game upgrades and skills; the physical special edition includes a Steelbook case and the comic series The Last of Us: American Dreams (2013) with new cover art. All key art and covers were designed by David Blatt, known as Kopfstoff, who was contracted after becoming known for his fan art of the games. The United States-exclusive Firefly Edition for PlayStation 5 sold out within an hour of its announcement; it received a restock at release, which sold out within seconds. Several players reported receiving damaged versions of the Firefly Edition due to poor packaging; Sony reportedly offered store discounts or refunds in some instances, but did not provide replacements. For the Windows release, the Firefly Edition will be available in the United States and some European countries, containing a digital version of the game for Steam.

Development of The Last of Us PartI for PlayStation 5 ceased by July 11 as the game was submitted for manufacturing. According to principal environment artist Anthony Vaccaro, the development did not involve any crunch, unlike several of Naughty Dog's previous games. The final pre-launch trailer was released on August 24, 2022. The game was released for PlayStation 5 on September 2. The Windows version missed its original release date of March 3, 2023, delayed three weeks to March 28. A trailer announcing the Windows release date was aired during the Game Awards 2022. A two-hour trial was released for PlayStation Plus Premium members on January 15, 2023, coinciding with the airing of the first episode of the television adaptation.

Reception

Critical response 

The Last of Us PartI received "generally favorable reviews", according to review aggregator Metacritic, based on 114 reviews for the PlayStation 5 version. It was praised for its graphical enhancements, updated facial animations, improved enemy and character AI, and its added accessibility, audio, and controller options, though the response to its gameplay and level design was mixed. Many reviewers considered it the definitive version of the game; VG247s Tom Orry named it "one of the best remakes I've ever played". Several reviewers questioned the necessity of the game, especially considering its price and the existence of The Last of Us Remastered; conversely, some critics compared it to a film remaster on an Ultra HD Blu-ray, seen as an acceptable practice in its industry. The omission of the multiplayer mode was lamented by critics. GameRevolutions Jason Faulkner found the absence of story additions to be "some huge missed opportunities", and Game Informers Blake Hester felt the lack of narrative changes exacerbated the outdated presentation of its themes.

IGNs Luke Reilly considered the game an effective graphical showcase for the PlayStation 5. Michael Goroff of Electronic Gaming Monthly (EGM) wrote that while the original game captured how players visualized a post-apocalyptic world, the remake's art style and graphics are more akin to how Joel or Ellie saw the world: "overgrown and dingy ... but it can also be beautiful or even mundane". The Verges Andrew Webster compared the improved graphics to modern blockbusters, and Siliconeras Josh Tolentino wrote that it matched his memory of the original. Ars Technicas Sam Machkovech praised the visual improvements but felt that the original did not require a full overhaul like Demon's Souls (2020), while Shacknewss TJ Denzer criticized the fuzzier visuals of Listen Mode. Critics praised the improved lighting system and minimalized user interface; The Telegraphs Dan Silver considered the former award-worthy, and EGMs Goroff felt the game never lost its narrative tone despite more realistic lighting.

Several reviewers considered the improved character models and facial animation the remake's greatest feature. EGMs Goroff and IGNs Reilly found they made the acting more effective, with new microexpressions adding depth to each character, which Ars Technicas Machkovech compared to awarded film performances. Game Informers Hester similarly observed the performances as more accurate and emotive without the original's awkwardness, and Video Games Chronicles Jordan Middler found the remake captured the intention of story and character moments where the original technologically could not. Alex Avard of GamesRadar+ felt that even briefly-seen NPCs looked better than Joel and Ellie did in the original, and Denzer of Shacknews said that the characters "look far less doll-like and emote far better".

Critics praised improvements to enemy and companion AI. Ars Technicas Machkovech compared the combat sequences to the original game's scripted reveal trailer, and GameSpots Jake Dekker found the improvements led to more tense and difficult encounters. Hardcore Gamers Kevin Dunsmore echoed this sentiment but noted some "wonkiness remains" from the original, with companions failing to follow correct paths. IGNs Reilly lamented the omission of Part IIs pre-scripted enemy names but otherwise praised the improvements to enemy AI. Siliconeras Tolentino found the changes superficial due to the identical map layouts and encounter designs, while EGMs Goroff felt the behavior remained simplistic, with enemies hasty to approach their fallen allies.

GameSpots Dekker found the gameplay improved in line with the story, with more responsive aiming, heavier weapons, and easier movements. The Telegraphs Silver found the updated controls made combat smoother, while VG247s Orry said they retained "a slight clunkiness" but ultimately led to more tense gameplay encounters. Gene Park of The Washington Post lauded the realistic gun controls and called Joel's movement "appropriately heavy"; likewise, Reilly of IGN noted that Joel and Ellie felt weightier and more realistic but lamented the lack of Part IIs dodge mechanic. Other reviewers similarly felt that combat and level design failed to compare to Part IIs, though recognized the former as a vast improvement of the original. GamesRadar+s Avard found the combat changes minimal, while Ars Technicas Machkovech felt the gameplay "still feels like a PlayStation 3 game" at worst. The A.V. Clubs William Hughes enjoyed the combat but found it could occasionally "tip over from 'exhilarating' to 'frustrating.

Reviewers praised the new options and features. GameSpots Dekker wrote that The Last of Us PartI "sets a new standard for accessibility in games". Siliconeras Tolentino called it one of the most accessible games, and Ars Technicas Machkovech found its options more robust than any other. The A.V. Clubs Hughes considered the accessibility options the only worthy addition, and Shacknewss Denzer highlighted the cutscene audio descriptions as a standout option. Ben Bayliss of Can I Play That? lauded the range of features for demonstrating "what is possible when a remake is done well", though noted some mobility issues and criticized the complexity required to balance different options. Critics lauded the use of the DualSense's haptic feedback, considered among the best uses to date alongside Astro's Playroom (2020). VideoGamer.coms Josh Wise felt the controller "added crunch to the combat" and The Verges Webster lauded its use of the bow. GamesRadar+s Avard found that 3D audio made the Infected more terrifying; the tension and horror led The Verge Webster to play without headphones and VG247s Orry to mute the sound, while Push Squares Barker noted its effectiveness led to limited usage of Listen Mode.

Accolades 
The Last of Us Part I was nominated for PlayStation Game of the Year at the 40th Golden Joystick Awards, and was nominated for Innovation in Accessibility at The Game Awards 2022. From PlayStation Blog, the game was named runner-up for Best Accessibility Features and Best Story, and placed third for Soundtrack of the Year. It won Outstanding Visual Effects in a Real-Time Project at the 21st Visual Effects Society Awards, and is nominated for Technical Achievement at the 19th British Academy Games Awards.

Sales 
In the United States, The Last of Us PartI was the fifth-best-selling game of September, and the fourth-best-selling PlayStation game. In the United Kingdom, it topped the weekly physical sales chart within its opening weekend, and dropped to fourth in its second week; combining digital and physical sales, it was the fifth-best-selling game of the month. In Japan, it was the fifth-best-selling retail game of its first week, with 10,954 copies sold. It was the third-most-downloaded PlayStation 5 game of September in Europe and North America, dropping in North America to eleventh in October, eighteenth in November, and twentieth in December. Following the debut of the television adaptation of The Last of Us in January 2023, the game increased to eighth-most-downloaded in North America and tenth in Europe, and sixth and seventh, respectively, in February. It rose to the eleventh-best-selling game in the United States in January, climbing 25 positions from the previous month, and reentered the retail charts in the United Kingdom with a 238 percent increase in weekly sales—305 percent including digital sales—and a further 32 percent the following week.

Notes

References

External links 
 
 
 

2022 video games
Action-adventure games
Fictional fungi
2020s horror video games
The Last of Us
LGBT-related video games
Naughty Dog games
PlayStation 5 games
Post-apocalyptic video games
Single-player video games
Sony Interactive Entertainment games
Stealth video games
Survival video games
Third-person shooters
Video game remakes
Video games about cannibalism
Video games about viral outbreaks
Video games about zombies
Video games developed in the United States
Video games featuring female protagonists
Video games scored by Gustavo Santaolalla
Video games set in 2013
Video games set in Boston
Video games set in Colorado
Video games set in Massachusetts
Video games set in Pennsylvania
Video games set in Pittsburgh
Video games set in Texas
Video games set in the 2030s
Video games set in Utah
Video games set in Wyoming
Video games written by Neil Druckmann
Windows games